This is an overview of the progression of the World track cycling record of the women's flying 500 m time trial as recognised by the Union Cycliste Internationale.

Progression

Amateurs (1955–1990)

Open (from 1992)

References

Track cycling world record progressions